"Fly Farm Blues" is a song by rock musician Jack White. The song was written and used for the rock documentary film It Might Get Loud, which featured White, along with Jimmy Page and The Edge. It was released by White's record label Third Man Records and online.

Composition
The song was written by White during the filming of It Might Get Loud, a documentary featuring White, after he and director Davis Guggenheim had discussed that songs nowadays are over-prepared and over-produced. Guggenheim, however, disagreed, and White wrote and recorded "Fly Farm Blues" in ten minutes. The song was used in the soundtrack for It Might Get Loud.

Release
The song was released as an A-side only 7-inch promotional vinyl record by White's label Third Man Records; originally only 300 copies were issued. The song is also available online at the iTunes Store and Spotify.

References

2009 singles
Jack White songs
Songs written by Jack White
Third Man Records singles
2008 songs